Giorgio Garri (born circa 1700, died circa 1731) was an Italian painter, active in  Naples as a painter of still-life scenes of fruits, flowers, and birds.

He was a pupil of Nicola Casissa. Grossi may confuse some of his biography with that of his brother, the painter Giovanni Grossi, since he claims the painter died in 1750. Giorgio's daughter, Columba, was also a painter married to the painter Tommaso Castellani, and their four daughters, Francesca, Ruffina, Apollonia, and Bibiana Castellani were also painters.

In modern accounting, Girogio died in 1731 after becoming blind. His brother was a painter of marine and landscapes, while his daughter was a painter of still lives of flowers and food, but later of cityscapes. Her daughter and husband were mainly ornamentalists.

References

Year of birth unknown
18th-century Italian painters
Italian male painters
Italian still life painters
Italian Baroque painters
Painters from Naples
1731 deaths
Year of birth uncertain
18th-century Italian male artists